Little Bay Islands is a vacant town in Newfoundland and Labrador, Canada. It consists of Little Bay Island, Macks Island, Goat Island, Harbour Island and Boatswain Tickle Island.

In February 2019, the permanent residents voted to be relocated and nearly all of the 55 residents departed by late December 2019. This was part of a relocation program operated by the provincial government for small communities that had become too expensive to service. Property owners who were permanent residents were paid at least $250,000 in compensation for relocation expenses. Two residents decided to stay, living off of the grid and installing solar panels and wireless internet.

A ferry, the MV Hazel McIsaac, served the island several times daily until it was discontinued on 31 December 2019. The two remaining residents broadcast the final departure on Facebook Live.

History
First settled in 1825, Little Bay Islands was once a thriving community of about 500 people that declined substantially after the cod fishing moratorium.

As of 2016, the town had a population of about 71 and was in rapid decline, down 27 percent from 2011. The community had a school (until 2016 used by two children and their only teacher), fire station, two churches and a bed and breakfast. The school and one of the churches closed prior to the relocation. The main employment source, a crab processing plant, closed in 2010, leaving the community with just three paying jobs by 2018 and mostly retirees. While there was a bed and breakfast, in 2018, the only paid employees in winter were the postmaster and two janitors.

Relocation 
The final vote for resettlement succeeded in 2019 after failed attempts in 2011 and 2016.

The ferry service and hydro electricity service ended on 31 December 2019. Only two inhabitants, a couple, opted to stay on the island; others may return to live there in summer. That is permitted because residents are allowed to retain their homes, even after accepting compensation, but would receive no government services.

The provincial government explained the payments made to property owners in this manner: "The funding provided to eligible permanent residents is not intended to compensate for the value of their property. As such, persons with permanent residences outside the community do not require financial assistance to relocate". The total paid was approximately $8.7 million. The government estimated that the relocation would save about $20 million over 20 years; a large portion of that amount is the savings produced by cancellation of the ferry service. The province's relocation program had saved about $30 million since it commenced in 2002.  A previous recentralization program, running from 1954 to 1975, resettled some 28,000 people from 300 remote locations.

The couple who decided to remain year-round, Georgina and Michael Parsons, told the news media in autumn 2019 that they were prepared to live off the grid in their recently built home with a well to provide drinking water. (They were not eligible to vote on relocation, since they had not lived in the community for an adequate amount of time.) The Parsons have accumulated a propane oven, wood stoves, satellite connection, a solar panel system, a snowmobile, a cell phone and boats to travel to the mainland to purchase supplies. "We look at it as an adventure. We’re looking forward to the solitude," Michael Parsons said in an interview.

On 31 December 2019, power to the Islands was cut at 2:30 p.m. and the last ferry left the dock after 5 p.m., an event recorded in a video clip by the Parsons.

The town recorded an official count of 0 in the 2021 census.

Demographics 

See also
 List of communities in Newfoundland and Labrador
 Resettlement (Newfoundland)

References

External links
YouTube video on these islands by Extremities

Towns in Newfoundland and Labrador
Islands of Newfoundland and Labrador
Road-inaccessible communities of Newfoundland and Labrador
Ghost towns in Newfoundland and Labrador